Neil Kane Sheehy (born February 9, 1960) is a Canadian-born American professional ice hockey player with dual citizenship. He grew up in International Falls, Minnesota.

A defenceman and Harvard University graduate, Sheehy signed as a free agent in 1983 by the Calgary Flames.  His tough defensive play would help guide the Flames to their first finals appearance in 1986.  He has also played for the Hartford Whalers and Washington Capitals. 

Sheehy is one of two NHL players who wore the number 0, the other was Paul Bibeault. After NHL statisticians discovered a bug in their new stat-tracking software, the league restricted jersey numbers to whole numbers between 1 and 99 (later limited to numbers between 1 and 98 after the league-wide retirement of number 99 for Wayne Gretzky). This gives Sheehy the distinction of being the last player in NHL history to wear the number 0, with the Hartford Whalers in 1988.

His older brother is former NHL and USA Olympic team member Timothy Sheehy.

Controversy
In May 1990, while playing for the Capitals, Sheehy was accused of raping a 17-year-old girl outside a bar, alongside teammates Dino Ciccarelli, Scott Stevens, and Geoff Courtnall. The court case fell apart, though a spokesperson for the Metropolitan police at the time stated that the police “have sufficient grounds to believe that a criminal offense did occur.”

Career statistics

Regular season and playoffs

International

References

External links

1960 births
Living people
American men's ice hockey defensemen
American people of Canadian descent
Calgary Flames players
Canadian ice hockey defencemen
Colorado Flames players
Hartford Whalers players
Harvard Crimson men's ice hockey players
HDD Olimpija Ljubljana players
Ice hockey people from Ontario
Ice hockey players from Minnesota
Moncton Golden Flames players
People from International Falls, Minnesota
Salt Lake Golden Eagles (IHL) players
Sportspeople from Fort Frances
Undrafted National Hockey League players
Washington Capitals players